Oslo Groove Company (active 1985-1996) was a Norwegian big band initiated and led by Jens Wendelboe (1985–87). In 1987 Lars Erik Gudim took the lead and Harald Devold led the band. They released three albums, two on their own label, Groove Records. The first album, Anno 1990, was awarded Spellemannprisen 1990.

Discography 
Albums
1990: Anno 1990 (Hot Club Records)
1991: Anno 1992 (Groove Records)
1996: Anno 1996 (Groove Records)

Contributors

Biography

References 

Norwegian jazz ensembles
Big bands
Spellemannprisen winners
Musical groups established in 1985
1985 establishments in Norway
Musical groups from Oslo